Marie of Saxe-Altenburg (Alexandrina Mary Wilhelmina Catherine Charlotte Theresa Henrietta Louise Pauline Elizabeth Frederica Georgina; ; 14 April 1818 – 9 January 1907) was Queen of Hanover as the wife of George V of Hanover, a grandson of George III of the United Kingdom and Queen Charlotte.

Early life
Marie was born at Hildburghausen, as Princess Marie of Saxe-Hildburghausen, the eldest daughter of Joseph, the Hereditary Prince of Saxe-Hildburghausen and Duchess Amelia of Württemberg. In 1826, the family moved to Altenburg as a result of a transfer of territories among the various branches of the Ernestine Wettins, and Marie took the title Princess of Saxe-Altenburg in place of the previous.

Marriage
Marie married, on 18 February 1843, at Hanover, George, Crown Prince of Hanover. They had three children: Prince Ernest Augustus, Princess Frederica, and Princess Marie.

Queen of Hanover

The Crown Prince, blind since his youth, and his wife became King and Queen of Hanover upon the death of his father, Ernest Augustus, King of Hanover, on 18 November 1851.

Between 1858 and 1867 George V had Marienburg Castle built as a birthday present to his wife, named after her. However, he was expelled from his kingdom in 1866 as a result of his support for Austria in the Austro-Prussian War, and on 20 September 1866, the Kingdom was annexed by Prussia. Nevertheless, George never abdicated; he emigrated to Vienna, Austria, while Marie and her daughters remained at Herrenhausen Palace, then moving to Marienburg Castle, which was still under construction, in September 1867. Marie succeeded in having the Hanoverian crown jewels and other precious items smuggled abroad, before finally leaving for Austria herself. There, the family moved into a villa in Gmunden near Salzburg, which they rented and later acquired.

On 18 September 1872, Queen Marie was godmother to Queen Victoria's granddaughter, Princess Marie Louise of Schleswig-Holstein. Princess Marie Louise was the youngest daughter of Princess Helena of Schleswig-Holstein-Sonderburg-Augustenburg; Queen Victoria & Prince Albert's third daughter and fifth child.

George V. died in 1878 on a travel in Paris where he had attempted to re-establish his Guelphic Legion, a military unit aimed at a re-conquest of his kingdom. He was buried in St George's Chapel at Windsor Castle. Queen Marie died, some twenty-eight years after her husband, on 9 January 1907, in The Queen's Villa (Königinvilla) at Gmunden, where she was later buried in a mausoleum that her eldest son had built next to his residence, Cumberland Castle.

Issue

Ancestry

External links

1818 births
1907 deaths
Hanoverian royal consorts
Cumberland
Wives of British princes
Hanoverian princesses by marriage
House of Hanover
House of Saxe-Altenburg
Ladies of the Royal Order of Victoria and Albert
Nobility from Hanover
People from Saxe-Hildburghausen
People from Hildburghausen
Princesses of Saxe-Altenburg
Burials at the Schloss Cumberland Mausoleum
Daughters of monarchs